Andrey Golubev was the defending champion but decided not to participate this year.
First-seeded Igor Kunitsyn defeated second-seeded compatriot Konstantin Kravchuk 4–6, 7–6(5), 7–6(3) in the final.

Seeds

Draw

Finals

Top half

Bottom half

References
Main Draw
Qualifying Singles

Astana Cup - Singles
2010 Singles